The 1953 Critérium du Dauphiné Libéré was the 7th edition of the cycle race and was held from 7 June to 14 June 1953. The race started and finished in Grenoble. The race was won by Lucien Teisseire.

General classification

References

1953
1953 in French sport
June 1953 sports events in Europe